Garswood railway station serves the village of Garswood in the Metropolitan Borough of St Helens, Merseyside, England. The station, and all trains serving it, are operated by Northern Trains, however the station is branded Merseyrail using Merseyrail ticketing.

History 
It later became part of the London and North Western Railway, with through running to Liverpool via Huyton commencing in 1871.

Facilities
The station has a ticket office on the northbound platform (1) and a waiting room on platform 2.  The ticket office is staffed throughout the hours of service (as is usual for Merseytravel-sponsored stations), seven days per week.  Customer help points, digital PIS displays and timetable poster boards are provided to offer train running information.  Step-free access is only available to platform 1, as platform 2 (for Liverpool) can only be reached via the footbridge (which has steps).

Services

On Sundays the service is also half-hourly in each direction, with one per hour through to Preston and Blackpool northbound.

Gallery

References

External links

Railway stations in St Helens, Merseyside
DfT Category E stations
Former London and North Western Railway stations
Railway stations in Great Britain opened in 1869
Northern franchise railway stations
1869 establishments in England